Julien Joachim Dacosta (born 29 May 1996), sometimes written Julien Da Costa, is a French professional footballer who plays as a defender for Nancy on loan from EFL Championship club Coventry City.

Personal life
Dacosta was born in France and is of Senegalese and Bissau-Guinean descent.

Career
Before joining Niort in 2017, he was a youth player with Olympique de Marseille, his hometown club. Dacosta made his Ligue 2 debut for Niort on 28 July 2017, in the 0–0 draw with AC Ajaccio.

He signed for English club Coventry City in July 2020.

On 2 February 2022, Dacosta joined Primeira Liga side Portimonense on loan for the remainder of the 2021–22 season.

On 27 June 2022, Dacosta joined EFL League One club Shrewsbury Town on loan for the 2022–23 season.

On 31 January 2023, Dacosta was recalled from his loan spell with Shrewsbury Town and joined Championnat National side Nancy for the remainder of the season.

Career statistics

References

1996 births
Living people
Footballers from Marseille
French footballers
French sportspeople of Senegalese descent
Association football defenders
Chamois Niortais F.C. players
Coventry City F.C. players
Portimonense S.C. players
Shrewsbury Town F.C. players
Ligue 2 players
English Football League players
Primeira Liga players
French expatriate footballers
French expatriate sportspeople in England
Expatriate footballers in England
French expatriate sportspeople in Portugal
Expatriate footballers in Portugal